Zanna may refer to:

Zanna, 1984 pop music song by Luc van Acker and Anna Domino
Zanna (planthopper), a genus of insects
Zanna (surname), multiple people

It may also refer to:

Given name
Zanna Hamilton (born 1960), English actress
Žanna Juškāne (born 1989), Latvian biathlete
Żanna Niemcowa (born 1984), Russian journalist
Zanna Proniadou (born 1978), Greek volleyball player
Zanna Roberts Rassi, British fashion journalist and businesswoman
Żanna Słoniowska (born 1978), Polish novelist and journalist

Other uses
Castello de Zanna, a fortress in the southern Alps
Zanna, fictional character in fantasy novel Un Lun Dun (2007) by China Miéville
Zanna, fictional character in fantasy novel The Fire Eternal (2007) by Chris D'Lacey
Zanna, Don't!, a 2003 Off-Broadway musical